Mario's War is a 2005 Italian drama film directed by Antonio Capuano. Valeria Golino won the 2006 David di Donatello for Best Actress for her performance as Giulia.

Plot summary
A determined mother struggles to raise her adopted son with love and understanding as the disapproving eyes of her boyfriend and mother weigh heavily on her conscience.

Cast 
Valeria Golino: Giulia
Andrea Renzi: Sandro
Anita Caprioli: Adriana Cutolo
Rosaria De Cicco: Nunzia
Nunzio Gallo

External links 
 

2005 films
2000s Italian-language films
2005 drama films
Films about children
Films set in Naples
Films directed by Antonio Capuano
Italian drama films
2000s Italian films
Fandango (Italian company) films